Eetu Tuulola (born 17 March 1998) is a Finnish professional ice hockey forward currently playing under contract with Ilves of the Liiga. He was selected by the Calgary Flames in the sixth round, 156th overall, of the 2016 NHL Entry Draft.

Playing career
Tuulola made his professional debut as a 17-year old with HPK during the 2015–16, collecting 1 assist in 10 games. Following his selection by the Flames at the 2016 NHL Entry Draft, Tuulola moved to North America to play major junior hockey with the Everett Silvertips of the Western Hockey League in the 2016–17 season. He signed with the Silvertips after he was originally selected by the club at the 2016 CHL Import Draft.

Tuulola contributed with 18 goals and 31 points in 62 games with the Silvertips, before opting to return to Finland to resume his professional career with HPK for the 2017–18 season. On December 7, 2017, Tuulola was signed to a two-year contract extension to remain with HPK through to 2020. In 60 games during the 2018–19 season, he contributed a career high marker with 23 assists for 36 points. He recorded 6 points in 18 playoff games to help HPK claim the Championship.

On 13 June 2019, Tuulola was signed to a three-year, entry-level contract with the Calgary Flames.

On 23 September 2020, with the 2020–21 North American season delayed due to the COVID-19 pandemic, Tuulola was loaned by the Flames to resume playing in the Swedish HockeyAllsvenskan, with Västerviks IK. He made 11 appearances in the Swedish second-tier league, collecting 4 points, before leaving after securing a loan in his native Finland, with Liiga club SaiPa, on 16 November 2020. Tuulola was scoreless in 4 games with SaiPa before his loan agreement ended, returning to North America to join the Flames' training camp.

At the conclusion of his entry-level deal with the Flames, Tuulola as an impending restricted free agent opted to return to Finland in agreeing to a one-year contract with Ilves of the Liiga on 23 June 2022.

Career statistics

Regular season and playoffs

International

Awards & honors

References

External links
 

1998 births
Living people
Calgary Flames draft picks
Everett Silvertips players
Finnish ice hockey right wingers
HPK players
People from Hämeenlinna
Ilves players
SaiPa players
Stockton Heat players
Västerviks IK players
Sportspeople from Kanta-Häme